Procesí k Panence is a 1961 Czechoslovak film. The film starred Josef Kemr.

References

External links
 

1961 films
Czechoslovak comedy films
1960s Czech-language films
Czech comedy films
1960s Czech films